FK Tukums 2000 is Latvian professional football club located in Tukums. Since its foundation, the club has been training young boys and girls. In 2007 the club formed a men's team that could play in the second-highest division of Latvian football (the Latvian First League).

History
FK Tukums was founded on May 20, 2000 as "FK Tukums-2000. The club started its participation in the Latvian Second League in 2004, finishing in 4th place. In 2005, FK Tukums-2000 played in the Latvian First League and finished in 13th place at the end of the season. The 2008 season was yet again spent in the Second League, the third tier of Latvian football. The club finished in 3rd place. Several players with Latvian Higher League experience were invited to join, and not surprisingly the team won the Latvian First League that year, being promoted to the Latvian Higher League. At the end of the 2014 season they were relegated to the Latvian First League.

Players

References

External links
Soccerway
Official website 

Tukums
Tukums 2000
2000 establishments in Latvia
Association football clubs established in 2000